Somdech Phra Pinklao Hospital is a hospital located in Thon Buri District, Bangkok, Thailand. It is a military hospital operated by the Naval Medical Department (NMD), The Royal Thai Navy particularly for personnel of the Royal Thai Navy, but also for the general public. It is also the location of the headquarters of the NMD. It has a CPIRD Medical Education Center which trains medical students for the Faculty of Medicine, Burapha University. It is an affiliated teaching hospital of Faculty of Medicine Siriraj Hospital, Mahidol University. It is also a residency training center for several specialty, for instance, Surgery, Emergency medicine and Maritime medicine.

History 
Construction of the hospital began in 1952, initiated by Admiral Sindh Kamalanavin, then commander-in-chief and Admiral Lek Sumitr, then chief doctor of the Royal Thai Navy. The hospital opened on 27 March 1957 as Bukkhalo Naval Hospital. On 11 November 1959, the name was changed to Somdech Phra Pinklao Hospital after Viceroy Pinklao, the younger brother of King Mongkut and commander of the Front Palace Navy in the 1850s. On 7 January 1966, a statue of Viceroy Pinklao was unveiled at the hospital by King Bhumibol Adulyadej and Queen Sirikit.

See also 
 Healthcare in Thailand
 Hospitals in Thailand
 List of hospitals in Thailand
 Royal Thai Navy

References 

Military hospitals in Thailand
Hospitals in Bangkok
Royal Thai Navy